Philipp Kohlschreiber was the defending champion, but lost in the second round to Karen Khachanov.

Paolo Lorenzi won the title, defeating Nikoloz Basilashvili in the final, 6–3, 6–4.

Seeds
The top four seeds receive a bye into the second round.

Draw

Finals

Top half

Bottom half

Qualifying

Seeds

Qualifiers

Qualifying draw

First qualifier

Second qualifier

Third qualifier

Fourth qualifier

References
 Main Draw
 Qualifying Draw

Generali Open Kitzbuhel - Singles
2016 Singles